Jörg Damme (born 9 May 1959 in Pretzsch) is a German former sport shooter who competed in the 1980 Summer Olympics, in the 1988 Summer Olympics, in the 1992 Summer Olympics, and in the 1996 Summer Olympics.

References

1959 births
Living people
German male sport shooters
Trap and double trap shooters
Olympic shooters of East Germany
Olympic shooters of Germany
Shooters at the 1980 Summer Olympics
Shooters at the 1988 Summer Olympics
Shooters at the 1992 Summer Olympics
Shooters at the 1996 Summer Olympics
Olympic bronze medalists for East Germany
Olympic medalists in shooting
Medalists at the 1980 Summer Olympics